The Western Districts Bulldogs Baseball Club is a baseball club located in Darra, Queensland, that participates in the Greater Brisbane League competition and the Brisbane West competition. They won the A-Grade premiership in 1983. In the Greater Brisbane League 2008–09 they finished last on the Southside. In the Greater Brisbane League 2009–10 they finished the season 4th and defeated Surfers Paradise, Redcliffe Padres and Windsor Royals in the finals to become premiers.

External links
Wests Website
ABF Profile
Mark 'The Ear' Oberhardt gives the rundown on sport Courier Mail
Baseball 11 January Courier Mail

Australian baseball clubs
Sporting clubs in Brisbane
Baseball teams in Australia
Greater Brisbane League